Princeton Airport may refer to:

 Princeton Aerodrome in Princeton, British Columbia, Canada
 Princeton Airport (New Jersey) near Princeton, New Jersey, United States

See also
 Princeton Municipal Airport (disambiguation)